Robert Thorburn,  (1818–1885) was a Scottish miniature-painter and associate of the Royal Academy.

Life 
Robert Thorburn, born at Dumfries in March 1818, was the son of a tradesman. He received his early education at Dumfries High School. He soon developed a love of art, and, owing to the kindness of a neighbouring lady, was at the age of fifteen sent to Edinburgh to draw at the Academy, where he made rapid progress and gained distinction. About three years later he came to London and entered the classes of the Royal Academy. As a native of Dumfries he enjoyed the special patronage of the Duke of Buccleuch, whereby he obtained many commissions.

Thorburn's success as a miniature-painter was soon secured, and for many years he shared the patronage of fashionable society with Sir William Charles Ross. In 1846 he received his first commission from Queen Victoria; many followed. Miniature-portraits of the Queen, and of the queen with Edward VII, when Prince of Wales, are reproduced in Sir R. R. Holmes's Queen Victoria (1897).

Thorburn's miniatures were of a larger size than usual, showing more of the figure and often accompanied by a landscape background. They are painted on large pieces of ivory, sometimes on pieces joined together. Their extreme finish produces a sense of monotony and flatness where the colours have lost their freshness. They were, however, very much admired at the time of their production, and at the Paris International Exhibition of 1855 Thorburn was awarded a gold medal. One of his most widely known miniatures is that of the Duchess of Manchester, a reproduction of which is given in J. J. Foster's British Miniature Painters (1898). The same work contains a portrait of Thorburn from a miniature by himself and a list of Thorburn's principal sitters, comprising most of the beautiful ladies of the time.

Thorburn was elected an associate of the Royal Academy in 1848. When photography began to supersede miniature painting, he took to oil-painting, and exhibited portraits and other subjects at the Royal Academy exhibitions with moderate success. He had a house at Lasswade, near Edinburgh, but died at Tunbridge Wells on 3 November 1885 in his sixty-eighth year, having quite outlived the great reputation of his earlier years.

Gallery 
{{Gallery|File:Robert Thorburn (1818-1885) - Juliana Pole-Carew (1812–1881), Lady Robartes - 884902 - National Trust.jpg|Juliana Pole-Carew, Lady Robartes (1839)|File:Charlotte Mary Hood, Baroness Bridport by Robert Thorburn.webp|Charlotte Mary Hood, Baroness Bridport|File:Duchess of Buccleuch and daughter Lady Victoria Scott.jpg|The Duchess of Buccleuch and her daughter Lady Victoria (1847)|File:Portrait of the Field Marshall Arthur Wellesley, 1st Duke of Wellington, by Robert Thorburn.jpg|The Duke of Wellington|File:Robert Thorburn (1818-85) - Prince Albert (1819-1861) and Ernest II, Duke of Saxe-Coburg-Gotha (1818-1893) - RCIN 406916 - Royal Collection.jpg|Prince Albert and Ernest II, Duke of Saxe-Coburg-Gotha (1851)|File:Georgiana Maria Tufnell, by Robert Thorburn.jpg|Mrs Georgina Maria Grenfell (Date unknown)|width=173|height=170|align=center|footer=}}

 References 

 Citations 

 Bibliography 

  
 Cust. L. H.; Burnette, Arianne (2004). "Thorburn, Robert (1818–1885), miniature painter". In Oxford Dictionary of National Biography. Oxford University Press.
 Foster, Joshua James (1898). British Miniature Painters and Their Works. Nottingham: R. B. Earp & Sons, Ltd. pp. 80–83, 91–97, 101, 110–111.
 Oliver, Valerie Cassel, ed. (2011). "Thorburn, Robert". In Benezit Dictionary of Artists''. Oxford University Press.

1818 births
1885 deaths
19th-century Scottish painters
Associates of the Royal Academy